Edward Rell "Ed" Madigan (January 13, 1936 – December 7, 1994) was a businessman and a Republican Party politician from Lincoln, Illinois. He served almost twenty years in the United States House of Representatives and was U.S. Secretary of Agriculture under President George H. W. Bush.

Early life, education, and politics
Madigan was born in Lincoln on January 13, 1936. He attended Lincoln [Junior] College before starting his own taxicab business. He entered public service as a member of the Lincoln Board of Zoning Appeals from 1965 to 1969. During that time, he was elected to the Illinois House of Representatives where he served from 1967 to 1973.

U.S. House of Representatives and U.S. Secretary of Agriculture
In November, 1972, he was elected as a Republican to the U.S. House of Representatives, and was subsequently elected to nine more terms. Madigan narrowly lost the race for Minority Whip in 1989 to future Speaker of the House Newt Gingrich of Georgia. Madigan served in Congress from 1973 to 1991, when Clayton Keith Yeutter resigned, and Madigan was appointed Secretary of Agriculture. Serving from 1991 to 1993, Madigan was the first Roman Catholic to serve as Secretary of Agriculture.

Death and legacy
He died of complications from lung cancer on December 7, 1994, at St. John's Hospital in Springfield, Illinois, at the age of 58. He and his wife, Evelyn, had three daughters.

In 1995, Edward R. Madigan State Fish and Wildlife Area, a state park near Lincoln, was renamed in Madigan's honor. Edward Madigan came from a politically active family. His younger brother Robert Madigan served as the City Clerk for Lincoln, Illinois for several terms, then sat in the Illinois State Senate for 14 years and finally concluded his public service with a brief term on the Illinois Commerce Commission.

In 1984, Illinois native, and future congressman from Nebraska Don Bacon interned in Madigan's Washington, D.C., office.

References

External links

 

  

|-

|-

|-

|-

|-

1936 births
1994 deaths
20th-century American politicians
Deaths from cancer in Illinois
Deaths from lung cancer
George H. W. Bush administration cabinet members
Lincoln College (Illinois) alumni
Republican Party members of the Illinois House of Representatives
People from Lincoln, Illinois
Republican Party members of the United States House of Representatives from Illinois
United States Secretaries of Agriculture